Joseph Bassett Holder (1824–1888) was an American zoologist and physician.

Holder was born in Lynn, Massachusetts, October 26, 1824 to parents Aaron L. and Rachel Bassett Holder. His mother was a Quaker minister.  Holder studied at the Friends' School in Providence, Rhode Island, and then entered the Harvard Medical School, where, while a student, he acted as demonstrator of anatomy for Oliver Wendell Holmes, and was present at the first administration of ether as an anesthetic. He became city physician of Lynn, was founder of the Lynn Natural History Society, and made the first list of birds and plants in Essex county. He was a friend and colleague of Louis Agassiz. 

In 1859 he accepted the position of physician for Fort Jefferson, Florida, at the request of Agassiz and  Spencer F. Baird of the Smithsonian, and for seven years made an elaborate study of the Florida reef, being the first to establish the rapid growth of corals, an opposite view being held previous to that. At the breaking out of the Civil War, Holder joined the army as surgeon, and remained as post surgeon and health officer at Fort Jefferson, during the war. Holder resigned in 1869, to join Albert S. Bickmore in the establishment of the American Museum of Natural History of New York City, and became the curator of invertebrates. He was the author of "The Florida Reef"; joint author with J. G. Wood of "Our Living World," an elaborate natural history; "The Museum of Natural History," written with Sir John Richardson; "The Atlantic Right Whale," and many scientific papers. He was a patron of the Metropolitan Museum of Art; a founder and fellow of the American Ornithological Union; a member of the Society of Eastern Naturalists; member of the Society for Psychical Research; fellow of the New York Academy of Sciences, Geographical and Linnaen societies, and member of the Harvard Club. He died in New York City on February 28, 1888.  His son Charles Frederick Holder (1851–1915) became a noted science writer himself, and collaborated with the elder Holder on Elements of Zoology.

References

External links

 

1824 births
1888 deaths
American ornithologists
American Quakers
People associated with the American Museum of Natural History
Harvard Medical School alumni
Physicians from Massachusetts
People from Lynn, Massachusetts
19th-century American zoologists